With the Fire on High is a young adult novel by Elizabeth Acevedo, published May 7, 2019 by Quill Tree Books.

Reception 
The book received starred reviews from Booklist, School Library Journal, The Horn Book, and Publishers Weekly, as well as positive reviews from Kirkus, The Washington Post, The New York Times, NPR, and Entertainment Weekly.

Publishers Weekly, School Library Journal, The Horn Book, Chicago Public Library, and NPR named it one of the best books of the year. 

The audiobook received a starred review from Booklist.

References 

2019 American novels
Quill Tree Books books
Novels set in Philadelphia
Novels set in Spain

American young adult novels